Comitán (formally: Comitán de Domínguez, for Belisario Domínguez) is the fourth-largest city in the Mexican state of Chiapas. It is the seat of government of the municipality of the same name.

The municipality has an area of 1,043.30 km² (402.82 sq mi). Its largest other community is the town of Villahermosa Yalumá.

Comitán is also a popular tourist destination, mostly for Mexican nationals, though some foreign visitors can also be seen.  The town possesses colonial architecture, narrow avenues, and clean streets.  The climate is cool most of the year, and can get quite chilly from October to March.

History
The old town was founded in a swamp by a group of Tzeltal people. The original name given by the local population was Balún Canán (which means "Nine stars").  As part of the Spanish colonization, the town of Comitan was founded in February 1528 and elevated to the city in 1556 by Dominican friars, belonging to the captaincy of Guatemala.  It was later changed to Comitán de las Flores and, in 1915, to Comitán de Domínguez,  after Dr. Belisario Domínguez, who gave a memorable speech in Congress against the dictator Victoriano Huerta for which he was murdered.

Climate
Comitán had a marginal subtropical highland climate (Köppen Cwb) a little below a tropical savanna climate. Afternoons are very warm with fairly high humidity almost throughout the year, whilst mornings are cool in the dry season and mild during the rainy season. The dry season gradually warms up between March and May, before the rainy season begins during May and continues with higher humidity until October, following which the coolest and most pleasant weather of the year prevails.

Demographics
As of 2010, the municipality had a total population of 141,013, up from 121,263 as of 2005.

As of 2010, the city of Comitán had a population of 97,537, up from 83,571 as of 2005. Other than the city of Comitán, the municipality had 340 localities, the largest of which (with 2010 populations in parentheses) were: Villahermosa Yalumá (2,368), San José Yocnajab (1,809), La Floresta (1,743), Los Riegos (1,740), Francisco Sarabia (1,673), Cash (1,429), Señor del Pozo (1,353), Zaragoza la Montaña (1,263), Efraín A. Gutiérrez (1,153), and Chacaljocom (1,056), classified as rural.

Nearby Attractions

Tourists in Comitán can see many touristic sights, including Mayan ruins, the Lagunas de Montebello, El Chiflon which is a series of waterfalls (this costs a few pesos to enter), Tenam Puente which is an archeological Mayan Cultural place, and others. Comitán is approximately 2 hours away from San Cristobal by bus and approximately 3 hours away from Tuxtla. It is common for locals to travel 2 hours on the bus to see San Cristobal and then travel an additional hour in order to reach Tuxtla.

Notes

References

Link to tables of population data from Census of 2005 INEGI: Instituto Nacional de Estadística, Geografía e Informática
Chiapas Enciclopedia de los Municipios de México

External links 
 http://www.comitan.gob.mx Ayuntamiento de Comitán official website

Municipalities of Chiapas
Pueblos Mágicos
Populated places established in 1528
1915 establishments in Mexico
Chiapas Highlands